Matherville is a village in Mercer County, Illinois, United States. The population was 707 at the 2020 census.

Geography

Matherville is located in northeastern Mercer County at  (41.260255, -90.605874).

The village sits on a hillside which drains to the south toward the Edwards River, a west-flowing tributary of the Mississippi River. Lake Matherville, a small reservoir, is in the northwest corner of the village.

Demographics

At the 2000 census there were 772 people, 290 households, and 216 families living in the village. The racial makeup of the village was 98.45% White, 0.26% Asian, 0.52% from other races, and 0.78% from two or more races. Hispanic or Latino of any race were 1.04%.   
  
Of the 290 households 45.2% had children under the age of 18 living with them, 55.5% were married couples living together, 15.2% had a female householder with no husband present, and 25.5% were non-families. 21.7% of households were one person and 10.7% were one person aged 65 or older. The average household size was 2.66 and the average family size was 3.06.   
    
The age distribution was 32.4% under the age of 18, 7.1% from 18 to 24, 31.2% from 25 to 44, 18.3% from 45 to 64, and 11.0% 65 or older. The median age was 32 years. For every 100 females, there were 90.6 males. For every 100 females age 18 and over, there were 80.6 males.   
    
The median household income was $33,438 and the median family income  was $39,375. Males had a median income of $37,273 versus $25,179 for females. The per capita income for the village was $14,956. About 14.1% of families and 15.8% of the population were below the poverty line, including 24.5% of those under age 18 and 4.0% of those age 65 or over.

Matherville is part of Sherrard Public Library District. Matherville is served locally by the Library District Bookmobile one day a week with a stop at the Old School Park.

References

Villages in Mercer County, Illinois
Villages in Illinois